Sister Marie Louise (October 1899 – July 10, 1999) was a Roman Catholic nun and sports commentator in Washington, D.C. "Weasie" appeared on WUSA-TV with sportscaster Glenn Brenner.

Early life 
Born in Washington, DC, to Rose Virginia Kreamer Kirkland (1858–1944) and William L. Kirkland (1848–1918), with siblings William Louis Kirkland (1892–1955) and Camille Rose Kirkland Fisher (1901–1982), she played basketball in high school in Montgomery County, Maryland. She earned a degree from Immaculata College and worked as a courthouse clerk in Rockville, Maryland until her 30s. She entered Georgetown Visitation Monastery on January 5, 1935, and remained there as a semi-cloistered nun for the rest of her life. Although she initially worried that she'd have to give up sports, she was permitted to follow them avidly, especially her favorite, football.

Career as a celebrity sports forecaster 
DC sportscaster Glenn Brenner (see above) was a Roman Catholic who graduated from Saint Joseph's University in Philadelphia, a Jesuit institution. When he heard from Georgetown Visitation Preparatory School alumnae that Sister Marie Louise had a talent for sports predictions, he invited her to call into his "Mystery Prognosticator Contest" in 1989. After she beat Brenner's other celebrity sports predictors including (according to her Washington Post obituary) "newscasters Dan Rather, Maureen Bunyan and Connie Chung; boxer Sugar Ray Leonard; actors William Shatner and Pee-Wee Herman (Paul Reubens); members of the Temptations; and football stars Sonny Jurgensen and Mark Rypien -- People magazine and other publications came courting." Brenner made her a regular, thanks to the permission of Mother Mary DeSales, who happened to be an avid fan of football, and the story was picked up internationally. People magazine put her story on its cover. She won $1,000 for each correct prediction, and donated it all to Visitation school.

References

See also

1900 births
1999 deaths
20th-century American Roman Catholic nuns